Nenad Radulović (Serbian Cyrillic: Ненад Радуловић; 13 September 1959 – 12 February 1990) was a Serbian rock musician, best known as the frontman of the Yugoslav pop rock band Poslednja Igra Leptira.

Biography
Radulović started his career as the singer and the leader of the pop rock band Poslednja Igra Leptira (Last Dance Of Butterfly) in 1979. The band released well-accepted albums Napokon ploča (At Last, a Record; 1982), Ponovo ploča & druge priče (Another Record & Other Stories; 1983), Opet ploča – Srce od meda (Again, a Record – Heart Made of Honey; 1985), Grudi moje balkanske (My Balkan Heart; 1986) and Zajedno smo piškili u pesku (We Peed in the Sand Together; 1987) before disbanding in 1989. During the same year, Radulović released his only solo album Niko nema što piton imade (Nobody Has what the Python Has), produced by Srđan Marjanović, which parodied "Turbo-folk music".

Death and legacy

He started working on the new album, but managed to record only the song "Modra bajka" ("Blue Fairytale") before he died of testicular cancer on 12 February 1990. When his brother asked him how he felt twenty minutes before he passed away, his last words are said to have been: "Well, it's not like I can play football now, but I'm good...". The song, Modra bajka, was released for the first time on the Poslednja Igra Leptira compilation album Modra bajka – Best of (1997).

In December 2011, a plateau in Belgrade was named after Radulović. In October 2012, a commemorative plaque in memory of Radulović was unveiled in Lajkovac.

Discography

Poslednja Igra Leptira

Studio albums
Napokon ploča (1982)
Ponovo ploča & druge priče (1983)
Opet ploča – Srce od meda (1985)
Grudi moje balkanske (1986)
Zajedno smo piškili u pesku (1987)

Compilations
Modra bajka – Best of (1997)

Solo

Studio albums
Niko nema što piton imade (1989)

Reference 

1959 births
1990 deaths
Singers from Belgrade
Serbian rock singers
Serbian pop singers
20th-century Serbian male singers
Yugoslav male singers
Yugoslav rock singers
Deaths from cancer in Serbia
Deaths from testicular cancer